Sergey Zagorsky (4 September 1886 – 4 June 1962) was a Russian equestrian. He competed in the individual jumping at the 1912 Summer Olympics.

References

External links
 

1886 births
1962 deaths
Russian male equestrians
Olympic equestrians of Russia
Equestrians at the 1912 Summer Olympics
Sportspeople from Zhytomyr